(frequently zinc acetate or zinc gluconate lozenges) are a group of dietary supplements that are commonly used for the treatment of the . The use of zinc supplements at doses in excess of 75 mg/day within 24 hours of the onset of symptoms has been shown to reduce the duration of cold symptoms by about 1 day in adults. Adverse effects with zinc supplements by mouth include bad taste and nausea. The intranasal use of zinc-containing nasal sprays has been associated with the loss of the sense of smell; consequently, in June 2009, the United States Food and Drug Administration (USFDA) warned consumers to stop using intranasal zinc.

The human rhinovirus – the most common viral pathogen in humans – is the predominant cause of the common cold. The hypothesized mechanism of action by which zinc reduces the severity and/or duration of cold symptoms is the suppression of nasal inflammation and the direct inhibition of rhinoviral receptor binding and rhinoviral replication in the nasal mucosa.

Effectiveness 

A 2016 meta-analysis on zinc acetate-lozenges and the common cold in 199 patients found that colds were 2.7 days shorter by zinc lozenge usage. This estimate is to be compared with the 7 day average duration of colds in the three trials.

A 2015 meta-analysis on zinc lozenges and the common cold found no difference in the effects of zinc acetate lozenges on diverse respiratory symptoms. Although zinc lozenges most probably lead to highest concentration of zinc in the pharyngeal region, a subsequent meta-analysis showed that the effects of high-dose zinc acetate lozenges did not significantly differ in their effects on pharyngeal and nasal symptoms.  The duration of nasal discharge was shortened by 34%, nasal congestion by 37%, sneezing by 22%, scratchy throat by 33%, sore throat by 18%, hoarseness by 43%, and cough by 46%. Zinc lozenges shortened the duration of muscle ache by 54%, but there was no significant effect on the duration of headache and fever.

A 2013 review which said that zinc supplementation might be helpful for the common cold was withdrawn by the Cochrane Collaboration over concerns about the data used.

Interactions
Some lozenge formulations do not contain enough zinc to effectively reduce the lengths of colds; some of them contain ingredients that bind zinc, like citric acid, which prevent the zinc from working.

Safety 
There have been several cases of people using zinc nasal sprays and suffering a loss of sense of smell. In 2009 the US Food and Drug Administration issued a warning that people should not use nasal sprays containing zinc.

Excessive zinc intake may result in an unpleasant taste and/or nausea.

Mechanism of action 
The hypothesized mechanism of action by which zinc reduces the severity and/or duration of cold symptoms is the suppression of nasal inflammation and the direct inhibition of rhinoviral receptor binding and rhinoviral replication in the nasal mucosa. Zinc has been known for many years to have an effect on cold viruses in the laboratory.  In the arteriviridae and coronaviridae families of virus that also cause the common cold, in vitro studies found that zinc ionophores block the replication of those viruses in cell culture.

References 

Medical treatments
Zinc
Common cold